Calamity Anne's Dream is a 1913 American silent short Western film directed by Allan Dwan and starring Louise Lester as Calamity Anne. The film also stars Harry von Meter, Dorothy Eliason Jacques Jaccard, Charles Morrison, Jack Richardson and Vivian Rich.

External links
 

1913 films
1913 Western (genre) films
American black-and-white films
American silent short films
Dream
Silent American Western (genre) films
1910s American films